The 10th annual 2006 Webby Awards were held on June 12, 2006, at the Cipriani Hotel in New York City and were hosted by the comedian Jon Stewart. Judging was provided by the 500-person International Academy of Digital Arts and Sciences, and winners were selected from among 5,500 entries from  around 40 countries worldwide. This award ceremony saw the creation of a new award category, "Best Viral Video".

Nominees and winners

(from http://www.webbyawards.com/winners/2006)

References
Winners and nominees are generally named according to the organization or website winning the award, although the recipient is, technically, the web design firm or internal department that created the winning site and in the case of corporate websites, the designer's client.  Web links are provided for informational purposes, both in the most recently available archive.org version before the awards ceremony and, where available, the current website.  Many older websites no longer exist, are redirected, or have been substantially redesigned.

External links
Official website

2006
2006 awards in the United States
2006 in New York City
June 2006 events in the United States

2006 in Internet culture